Ceratoxanthis adriatica is a species of moth of the family Tortricidae. It is found in former Yugoslavia. The habitat consists of dry slopes near the Adriatic Sea.

The wingspan is about 20 mm. The ground colour of the forewings is pale yellow, edged with ferruginous brown at the basal half of the costa. The marking have the form of dark ferruginous-brown-metallic scales. The hindwings are pale greyish brown.

Etymology
The species is named for the position of the type locality on the Adriatic coast.

References

Moths described in 2003
Cochylini